Lauren Aspinall (born 15 August 1998) is an Australian female professional squash player. As of July 2018, she is ranked 126 according to the PSA World rankings. She achieved her highest career singles ranking of 97 in January 2018 during the course of 2018 PSA World Tour.

References

External links 
 

1998 births
Living people
Australian female squash players
Sportspeople from Adelaide
21st-century Australian women